Georg Bachmann (6 December 1885 Westheim – 23 October 1971 Gunzenhausen) was a German politician. During his political career he represented the DNVP, CNBL and the Christian Social Union of Bavaria (CDU) during 1949 - 1954. From 1940 to 1945 he was a member of the Nazi Party. He was a member of the Landtag of Bavaria.

Literature
 Reichshandbuch der Deutschen Gesellschaft. Das Handbuch der Persönlichkeiten in Wort und Bild, Erster Band, Deutscher Wirtschaftsverlag, Berlin 1930, S. 49. Mikrofiche-Ausgabe, München: Saur, o. J.

See also
List of Bavarian Christian Social Union politicians

References

1885 births
1971 deaths
People from Weißenburg-Gunzenhausen
People from the Kingdom of Bavaria
German Lutherans
German National People's Party politicians
Christian-National Peasants' and Farmers' Party politicians
Nazi Party politicians
Nazi Party members
Christian Social Union in Bavaria politicians
Members of the Reichstag of the Weimar Republic
Officers Crosses of the Order of Merit of the Federal Republic of Germany
20th-century Lutherans